This is list of archives in Barbados.

Archives in Barbados 

 Barbados National Archives
 West Indies Federal Archives Centre

See also 
 List of archives
 List of libraries in Barbados
 List of museums in Barbados
 Culture of Barbados

External links 
 Barbados National Archives (Department of Archives)

 
Archives
Barbados
Archives